Kozlovsky (masculine), Kozlovskaya (feminine), or Kozlovskoye (neuter) is the name of several rural localities in Russia:
Kozlovsky, Republic of Bashkortostan, a village in Urman-Bishkadaksky Selsoviet of Ishimbaysky District of the Republic of Bashkortostan
Kozlovsky, Belgorod Oblast, a settlement in Novooskolsky District of Belgorod Oblast
Kozlovsky, Karachevsky District, Bryansk Oblast, a settlement under the administrative jurisdiction of Karachev Urban Administrative Okrug in Karachevsky District of Bryansk Oblast
Kozlovsky, Pochepsky District, Bryansk Oblast, a settlement in Belkovsky Rural Administrative Okrug of Pochepsky District of Bryansk Oblast
Kozlovsky, Sverdlovsk Oblast, a settlement under the administrative jurisdiction of the City of Yekaterinburg in Sverdlovsk Oblast
Kozlovsky, Anninsky District, Voronezh Oblast, a settlement in Berezovskoye Rural Settlement of Anninsky District of Voronezh Oblast
Kozlovsky, Talovsky District, Voronezh Oblast, a settlement in Dobrinskoye Rural Settlement of Talovsky District of Voronezh Oblast
Kozlovskaya, Arkhangelsk Oblast, a village in Rakulo-Kokshengsky Selsoviet of Velsky District of Arkhangelsk Oblast
Kozlovskaya, Komi Republic, a village in Loyma Selo Administrative Territory of Priluzsky District of the Komi Republic